Reverend Bizarre / Mr Velcro Fastener is a split EP by Finnish doom metal band Reverend Bizarre and electro music duo Mr Velcro Fastener, released in 2008 on the Solina label. In typical split-album fashion, Mr Velcro Fashioner covers a Reverend Bizarre song while Reverend Bizarre covers a song by Mr Velcro Fastener.

Track listing
Side A (Mr Velcro Fastener)

Side B (Reverend Bizarre)

Reverend Bizarre albums
2008 EPs